Froseth or Frøseth is a surname. Notable people with the surname include:

 Glen Froseth (born 1934), American politician
 Hege Frøseth (born 1969), Norwegian handball player
 Kristine Froseth (born 1996), American and Norwegian actress and model

Norwegian-language surnames